Formula Lightning was an electric type of single-seat open-wheel formula racing.

Each participant in the Formula Lightning series purchased an identical rolling chassis, then designed and built the electric drive system for their vehicle. There were no changes allowed in the chassis design without majority approval of the Formula Lightning Owners Association. This ensured student teams could concentrate on the electric drive without the necessity of designing specialized mechanical chassis components.

These vehicles raced first in 1994 at the Grand Prix of Cleveland CART race with the University of Notre Dame winning the event and since then have participated in venues across the country.  The final official series race was held in October 2004 at Mid-Ohio Sports Car Course.

Ohio State University was the leading series champion.

Auto racing series in the United States
Lightning
Lightning
Recurring sporting events established in 1994
Recurring events disestablished in 2004
Defunct auto racing series
Electric vehicles